John A. Bentley (January 27, 1836 – 1912) was an American lawyer and politician.  He was United States Commissioner of Pensions under the last year of Ulysses S. Grant's presidency and through the presidency of Rutherford B. Hayes.  He also served as a member of the Wisconsin State Senate in 1865 and 1866.

Biography
Bentley was born in Kingsbury, New York, to Cornelius and Mary Brayton Bentley.  As a boy, he worked on his father's farm and attended public schools in the vicinity.  He studied law under Judge Enoch H. Rosekrans, of the New York Supreme Court, and Orange Ferriss, who would later serve in Congress.  He graduated from Albany Law School in 1857 and was admitted to the New York State Bar Association.  He established a legal practice in Glens Falls, New York, where he remained until 1859.

In March 1859, he traveled to the state of Wisconsin, first establishing himself at Manitowoc, then moving to Sheboygan.  In 1864, he was elected to represent Sheboygan County in the Wisconsin State Senate on the National Union ticket.  He left the senate after a single two-year term and became President of the Sheboygan and Fond du Lac Railroad.

In 1876, he was appointed by President Ulysses S. Grant to be United States Commissioner of Pensions after the brief term and resignation of fellow Wisconsinite Charles R. Gill.  Bentley went on to serve through the remainder of Grant's term and through the four years of the presidency of Rutherford B. Hayes, relinquishing his office when a successor was appointed by President James A. Garfield.

After leaving office, he moved to Denver, Colorado, and restarted his legal practice.

Family and personal life
On September 5, 1861, Bentley married Isabella J. Peat (1837–1917). They had one son, William R. Bentley (1867–1941). The family grave is in Glens Falls, New York.

References

1836 births
1912 deaths
People from Kingsbury, New York
People from Manitowoc, Wisconsin
Republican Party Wisconsin state senators